The Anubis is a Romanian remote controlled weapon station (RCWS) designed and manufactured by the Pro Optica company. It can use either a 7.62×51mm or a 12.7×99mm machine gun, and can also mount 40 mm grenade launchers. Optionally, the turret can be equipped with level 2 STANAG 4569 ballistic protection.

The Anubis is gyrostabilized on two axes, and is equipped with a thermal imager, a CCD camera, an automatic fire control system, as well as an easy-safe laser range finder. Detection ranges during night can go up to 6 km for a vehicle and 3 km for a human being, these distances are reduced to one-third for identification. The turret is electrically controlled, but can also be controlled manually as a backup.

In use
The Anubis RCWS was first seen at the National Military Parade in 2014, where it was mounted on a Dacia Duster military model. In 2018, it was presented at the  exposition.

A first contract was signed in 2017 when it was announced that the Romanian Navy purchased 4 turrets equipped with 12.7 mm machine guns. The systems were to be added on the frigates, in order to provide anti-piracy capabilities. In 2021, at the Egypt Defence Expo, it was announced that Egypt acquired a new lot of Anubis systems. Pro Optica previously delivered a number of Anubis turrets equipped with 12.7 mm machine guns to the Egyptian Army. The systems are used by the Egyptian 4x4 light armored vehicles.

In 2023, several BMC Kirpi MRAPs with Anubis RCWS systems were spotted in Ukraine. These vehicles were part of a delivery of over 40 Kirpi MRAPS in support of Ukraine in the 2022 Russian Ukrainian war.

References

External links
PRO OPTICA - ANUBIS Presentation video on YouTube

Vehicle weapons
Remote weapon stations
Weapons of Romania